Sir Christopher Llewellyn Bullock, KCB, CBE (10 November 1891 – 16 May 1972), a prominent member of the Bullock family, was Permanent Under-Secretary at the British Air Ministry from 1931 to 1936. Appointed at the age of 38, he remains one of the youngest civil servants to have headed a British government department.

Early years
Bullock  was the son of Rev. Llewellyn Christopher Watson Bullock and his wife Cecil Augusta Margaret Bullock (née Spearman), granddaughter of Thomas FitzMaurice, 5th Earl of Orkney. Bullock's academic achievements were considerable;  he gained a classical scholarship from Rugby - where his father was a teacher -  to Trinity College, Cambridge, from which he graduated in the first division of the first class of the Classical Tripos in 1913, twice winning a Browne medal, and was offered a fellowship at Trinity. Bullock, Hugh Lupton and Hugh's  first cousin,  Lionel Martineau Lupton,  were all at Trinity together in the October 1912 - June 1913 year. Lionel  Lupton was the  brother of Olive Middleton; the siblings' second cousin was Barbara Lupton who had studied  at Newnham College, Cambridge, alongside their sister Anne Lupton. Having met through their Cambridge rowing connections, Bullock and  Barbara Lupton were married  in London in 1917.

World War I
Following his Cambridge studies,  Bullock took first place in the open competition for the Home and Indian Civil Services and in 1914, he chose India. However,  at the outbreak of World War I, he volunteered for service with the Rifle Brigade Special Service. He was one of three officers (and 175 men) of the battalion wounded on 6 July 1915 during a major attack by the 11th Infantry Brigade on the German trenches near the small Flanders village of Boesinghe (Boezinge), about three miles north of Ypres, following the Second Battle of Ypres. He was seriously wounded and mentioned in dispatches.

Role in British aviation
Returning to active service, he was seconded to the Royal Flying Corps, training as an observer and then gaining his wings as a pilot in Egypt before being declared unfit for flying duties in 1917.

He then joined the Air Staff, beginning his work for the Air Ministry, and was appointed O.B.E. in 1919. He was appointed C.B.E. in 1926, C.B. in 1929 and K.C.B. in 1932.

Royal Air Force
In 1919, he became principal private secretary to Winston Churchill, then Secretary of State for Air. From then on until 1930, he served successive Secretaries of State including Sir Samuel Hoare and The Lord Thomson, fighting with Lord Trenchard, as Trenchard's right-hand man on the civilian side, against resistance and powerful forces within Whitehall and the hostility of the Navy and the Army to the establishment of a permanent independent Royal Air Force.

On 12 June 1930, the prime minister, Ramsay MacDonald, agreed to his appointment as Permanent Under-Secretary at the age of 38.

During the 1930s, he worked with great determination under considerable pressure on the expansion of the RAF during the period in which the menace of Nazism rose in Germany. Bullock was personally committed to the policy of expansion and strove, against the pacific temper of the time, to awaken public and Parliament to the need to strengthen the RAF to meet the dangers that lay ahead. Even when Churchill was not in government during the 1930s, Bullock supplied him with figures on German air strength which Churchill used in attacking the government's policy of appeasement. His supporters included T.E. Lawrence, who wrote in 1934, "Bullock is doing well. I wish he was C.A.S. (Chief of the Air Staff) and the Air Council as well!". His achievements have been justly recognised in the accounts of rearmament and the role of the RAF during the Second World War.

Described as "a man of brilliant youthful academic achievement and manic self regard", and by Trenchard as "the man with the finest brain I ever met with" and one of his own chief advisers, Bullock made powerful enemies – "but not in the Air Ministry!" – as he sought to impose his views of the emerging power of the aeroplane on the Armed Forces and the government.  Among those who took against him was Sir Warren Fisher, the Head of the Civil Service, who was notorious for his wish to control senior appointments in the civil service and to second-guess defence policy.

The survival of Britain in the Second World War was largely due to the foundations that Bullock laid for the vast expansion of the RAF. Of all the civil servants known by Lord Hankey, Secretary of the Cabinet, Bullock made by far the greatest creative contribution to the Defence effort. For ten peacetime years, Bullock worked as if already at war.

Civil aviation
He also made a great impact on the extension of British Civil Aviation through his support for Imperial Airways and by his part in creating the Empire Air Mail Scheme, in which he went as a passenger in one of the early proving flights to India in December 1926. He negotiated overflight and landing rights with South Africa and other African administrations, Australia and India.

In 1929, he participated in early test flights of the government funded airship, R101, part of the Imperial Airship Scheme. He was instrumental in persuading the Secretary of State for Air, Christopher Birdwood Thomson, 1st Baron Thomson – an enthusiastic proponent of airships – to delay the construction of a larger and more expensive airship, R102 (which would have cost over £2m at contemporary prices), until R101 had successfully completed its maiden flight to India.  In the event Bullock's caution was justified. R101 crashed only a few hours into its maiden flight, killing Lord Thomson and most of the crew.  Shortly afterwards the government abandoned the Imperial Airship Scheme.

Dismissal
On 6 August 1936, he was dismissed from his post by the prime minister, Stanley Baldwin, on the advice of Sir Warren Fisher, following the report of a Board of Inquiry into his dealings with Sir Eric Geddes, the Chairman of Imperial Airways.  The board found that he had abused his position as head of the ministry to seek a place on the board of Imperial Airways, at a time when his ministry was negotiating with the company to establish an air mail service – he had "interlaced public negotiations entrusted to him with the advancement of his personal or private interests" but also that "he at no time appreciated the gravity or fully realised the true nature or possible consequences of what he was doing and we consider that his failure to do so goes far to explain, though it cannot excuse, what has occurred".

As far as is known, he remains the only Permanent Under-Secretary to have been dismissed from the civil service.

After his dismissal, he received thousands of letters of support.  His case was taken up in the United States by Time magazine, which wrote: "Thus Sir Christopher Bullock had his career broken last week without anything specific being brought out against him. Among British aviators, the view was that Sir Christopher is easily worth ten of the men who investigated and broke him." "The gentlemen of the Air Ministry recently manoeuvred Prime Minister Stanley Baldwin into dismissing the only one of its civil servants with a practical grasp of Britain's colossal problems in air rearmament, Sir Christopher Bullock."

On leaving the Civil Service, Bullock went on to pursue a successful career in business, being appointed to the board of a number of public companies.

Recognition

Within the government doubts quickly began to be voiced about the justice of his treatment. Even his secretary of state and the prime minister in 1936, Baldwin, wrote letters admitting that their decision had been wrong. As former prime minister, Baldwin later wrote "I feel it only right to say that, if I had had the full evidence before me which has now been made available, I should not have taken the decision I reluctantly did". Writing in November 1937, Lord Hankey stated "the more I think about it the more I feel that the punishment did not fit the crime". In December 1938, the Marquess of Londonderry – the Secretary of State for Air at the time of the dismissal – wrote privately to Baldwin "[Bullock] was most unjustly treated and was the victim of the inveterate hatred of a civil servant Sir Warren Fisher who should never have been allowed to encompass his downfall, as he undoubtedly did."

In the spring of 1940, the injustice he had suffered was privately recognised when he was offered the Headship of the Petroleum Warfare Department which would have been de facto reinstatement and full restitution. Bullock declined, arguing that he was more valuable to the war effort as an industrialist.

After the war, his case was reviewed by the Lord Chancellor, Lord Jowitt, who concluded that the case against Bullock would have met if he had been allowed to resign in 1936 as no corruption was alleged – "it was really a case in which his zeal had outrun his discretion". Nonetheless, Jowitt advised the Prime Minister Clement Attlee that he should not alter the decision "after all these years". Accordingly, Attlee wrote to confirm Jowitt's conclusions but Bullock did not regard this as adequate redress.

Viscount Templewood wrote, in 1957, "Whatever may have been the merits of the dispute in which he (Bullock) was then involved – and I may say that I took his side, and that none of the charges in any way affected his honour – the fact remains that by his departure the Air Force lost one of its ablest defenders".

Despite campaigning for many years, Bullock never secured the redress he desired and died in 1972 without any official statement being issued about his treatment.

Public acknowledgement that his dismissal had been mistaken was belatedly made after his death when his memorial service at the Central Church of the Royal Air Force, St Clement Danes was attended by representatives of the prime minister, (Victor Goodhew M.P.), Parliamentary Under-Secretary of State for Defence (RAF), (Lord Lambton M.P.), the Home Civil Service (Permanent Under Secretary of State for the Ministry of Defence, Sir James Dunnett) and the Air Force Board (Air Chief Marshal Sir Edmund Hudleston and Air Chief Marshal Sir Denis Smallwood). The Address was given by The Rt. Hon. Lord Geoffrey Lloyd M.P.

Sir William Armstrong, Head of the Civil Service at the time of Bullock's death, wrote of "a great personal tragedy which clouded the rest of his life", many considering that "his treatment had been unduly severe", there being "no doubt at any time about his great abilities".

Family

Bullock's elder brother was Professor Walter Llewellyn Bullock. His youngest brother, pilot Osmund Fitzmaurice Bullock (1905-1933) - named after their  grandmother Lady Maria Louisa FitzMaurice (1837-1917) - was killed in a plane crash  on 2 October 1933;  the accident occurring during Bullock's  tenure as Permanent Under-Secretary for the Air Ministry.

On 18 April 1917, he married Barbara May Lupton at the main Unitarian church of West London, Essex Church, The Mall, Kensington.  Sir Christopher and Lady Bullock had two sons, Richard Henry Watson Bullock CB and Edward Anthony Watson Bullock, both of whom entered public service, in the Home Civil Service and the Foreign and Commonwealth Office respectively.

References

Permanent Under-Secretaries of State for Air
20th-century British businesspeople
1891 births
1972 deaths
People educated at Rugby School
Alumni of Trinity College, Cambridge
Knights Commander of the Order of the Bath
Commanders of the Order of the British Empire